The Una da Aldeia River is a river in the south of the state of São Paulo, Brazil.
It is a tributary of the Ribeira de Iguape River.

Course

The Una da Aldeia River originates in the municipality of Juquiá, São Paulo, near the BR-116 highway.
In its upper course it is named the Itimirim River
It flows in a southeast direction, roughly parallel to the SP-222 highway, entering the municipality of Iguape.
It is joined by the Espraiado River from the left, which flows from the Juréia-Itatins Ecological Station.
The Una da Aldeia River continues southeast and joins the Ribeira de Iguape River not far from that river's mouth on the Atlantic Ocean.

See also
List of rivers of São Paulo

References

Sources

Rivers of São Paulo (state)